The men's 10 metre platform was part of the Diving at the 2006 Commonwealth Games program. The competition was held on 22 March 2006 at Melbourne Sports and Aquatic Centre in Melbourne, Australia.

Format
The competition was held in two rounds:
 Preliminary round: All 10 divers perform six dives, and as there are only 10 competitors, they all advance to the final.
 Final: The 10 divers perform six dives; these are added onto the preliminary round scores and the top three divers win the gold, silver and bronze medals accordingly.

Schedule
All times are Australian Eastern Daylight Time (UTC+11).

Results
Results:

References

Diving at the 2006 Commonwealth Games